"Emerald City" is a 1967 song by The Seekers about a visit to the fictional Emerald City from L. Frank Baum's Oz books. Set to the tune of "Ode to Joy" from Beethoven's Ninth Symphony, "Emerald City" reached #50 on the UK Charts in 1967.

The song was recorded in 1967 and released as a single around Christmas in 1967. The original writing credit was given to Kim Fowley and John Martin, but during a 1993 reunion tour, The Seekers revealed that "John Martin" was actually the pen name of band member Keith Potger.

References

External links
 

1967 songs
Songs written by Kim Fowley
Songs written by Keith Potger
Columbia Graphophone Company singles
The Seekers songs